King Swope (August 10, 1893 – April 23, 1961) was an American attorney and politician who served as a U.S. representative from Kentucky.

Biography
Born in Danville, Kentucky, he attended the common schools and graduated from Danville's Centre College in 1914, and from the law department of the University of Kentucky at Lexington in 1916. He was admitted to the bar in 1915, and commenced practice in Lexington.

Swope enlisted and served during World War I as captain of infantry. He was elected as a Republican to the Sixty-sixth Congress by special election, to fill the vacancy caused by the death of Harvey Helm (August 1, 1919 – March 3, 1921). He was an unsuccessful candidate for reelection to the Sixty-seventh Congress in 1920.

Swope was appointed aide-de-camp with the rank of colonel on the staff of Governor Edwin P. Morrow in 1919, before resuming the practice of law. He was the chairman of the Republican executive committee of Fayette County, Kentucky, from 1928 to 1931, and was appointed and subsequently elected a judge of the circuit court of the twenty-second judicial district of Kentucky and served from 1931 to 1940. He was the unsuccessful Republican nominee for Governor of Kentucky in 1935 and 1939. He was a delegate to the Republican National Convention in 1936, 1940, and 1944, and was chairman of the Republican State convention in 1936. He was also a member of the judicial council of Kentucky from 1931 to 1940. He died in Lexington, Kentucky, in 1961 and was buried at Lexington Cemetery.

References

External links 
 
 

1893 births
1961 deaths
American Disciples of Christ
American military personnel of World War I
Centre College alumni
Kentucky lawyers
Kentucky state court judges
Politicians from Danville, Kentucky
University of Kentucky alumni
Republican Party members of the United States House of Representatives from Kentucky
20th-century American judges
20th-century American politicians
20th-century American lawyers